Saline County Courthouse is a historic courthouse located at Marshall, Saline County, Missouri. It was designed by John C. Cochrane and built in 1882–1883. It is a two-story, cruciform plan, red brick building and measures 100 feet by 110 feet. It features a four-stage, square clock tower with a pyramidal slate roof atop the intersecting wings.

It was added to the National Register of Historic Places in 1977.

References

Clock towers in Missouri
County courthouses in Missouri
Courthouses on the National Register of Historic Places in Missouri
Government buildings completed in 1883
Buildings and structures in Saline County, Missouri
National Register of Historic Places in Saline County, Missouri